The 2020 Segunda División B play-offs (Playoffs de Ascenso or Promoción de Ascenso) are the final play-offs for promotion from 2019–20 Segunda División B to the 2020–21 Segunda División. The four first placed teams in each one of the four qualify for the promotion play-offs. Due to the COVID-19 pandemic, the relegation play-off was cancelled.

Play-offs were played on 18 and 19 July as single-legged matches at a neutral venue.

Venues
On 9 June 2020, the Royal Spanish Football Federation announced that the play-offs are to be played in three locations of Andalusia.

Format
The four group winners had the opportunity to promote directly. They were drawn into a single game series where the two winners were promoted to the Segunda División. For this year, the final which normally took place between the two winners to decide the overall champion of Segunda B was removed. The two losing semi-finalists entered the play-off round for the last two promotion spots. 

The four group runners-up were drawn against one of the three fourth-placed teams outside their group while the four third-placed teams were drawn against each other in a single game series. The six winners advanced with the two losing semi-finalists to determine the four teams that play for the last two promotion spots.

As the regular season was suspended due to the COVID-19 pandemic, the qualified teams were chosen according to the position after the last round played before the suspension.

The draw of the first stage was held on 25 June.

Group winners promotion play-offs

Qualified teams

Matches

|}

Non-group winners promotion play-offs

First round

Qualified teams

Matches

|}

Second round

Qualified teams

Matches

|}

Third round

Qualified teams

Matches

|}

References 

Segunda División B play-offs
2020 Spanish football leagues play-offs
2019–20 Segunda División B